Deus is a science fiction series on Israeli television about a "human" software Deus, and about the hacker's world. The show was ran on Arutz HaYeladim (The Kids' Channel).

Background 
Deus is an Internet bot with artificial intelligence, and has full control over the computer, the software was given free for all the people on a USB. The software has human feels and interacts with the PC user with a webcam. All of the software is controlled from one Deus in a secret room inside the high tech. The software starts to have a full control over the world and the Deus sees everything, the humans start a war versus the software.

Characters

School 
Danny Heisner (Michael Moshonov): Hacker and gamer, the best friend of Tom.
Adise Eklilo (Ester Rada): Outstanding student in mathematics, she is a hacker too.
Idan Gavish (Michael Lewis): The king of the class, basketball player former, started to be gamer.
Rona Rafaeli-Marom (Adi Himmelbleu): Outstanding student and the class queen.
Tom Moyal (Itai Shor): Rapper, the best friend of Danny.
Dafna Morag (Ayala Lifshitz): Blogger and gossip girl.

Haitzner Family 
Yoav Heisner (Yoav Hait): The father of Danny, works in high tech.
Dor Alona Heisner (Sigalit Tamir): The mother of Danny, a Surgeon.

Police and Mosad 
Schneider (Neta Spiegelmann): A cop.
Benny Zion (Kobi Mahat): A cop.
Ze'evi (Idan Gil): Head detective of the police.
Nimrod (Mickey Leon): Mossad agent (Fake, actually a criminal).

Other Characters 
Dr. David Gold (Dror Keren): CEO of high - tech.
Professor Werner (Tzahi Hanan): Scientist responsible for the development of Deus. Kidnapped.
Barkan (Ori Klausner): Offender. 
Dr. Honig (Svetlena Demidov): Scientist responsible for the development of Deus.

References 

2008 Israeli television series debuts
Israeli children's television series
Israeli science fiction television series
2000s Israeli television series
2010s Israeli television series
2010 Israeli television series endings
Israeli teen drama television series